The 2020 U.S. Cross Country Junior National Championships were held from 8 to 14 March 2020 in Truckee, California at the Auburn Ski Club Training Center. On 12 March, halfway through the championships, U.S. Ski and Snowboard announced that all sanctioned events scheduled prior to 16 March would proceed as planned, even amidst growing concerns due to the spread of COVID-19. Later that same day, all remaining U.S. domestic events were cancelled.

Competition schedule

Medal summary

Medal table 

*Host Division

**Guest skier not counted towards total

U20 boys

U20 girls

U18 boys

U18 girls

U16 boys

U16 girls

Alaska Cup 
Since 1986, the Alaska Cup has been awarded to the outstanding Division at the Junior Nationals. Alaska Cup points are awarded to the top 20 skiers in each race. Guest skiers do not receive or displace Alaska Cup points.

References 

Skiing and Snowboarding articles by importance